Nan Chiang may refer to:

, a Panamanian cargo ship in service 1947-50
Nan Chiang (actor), Chinese actor in All in the Family (film) and 18 Bronzemen